Ivan Jullien (October 27, 1934 – January 3, 2015) was a French jazz trumpeter.

Jullien played with Claude Bolling and Jacques Denjean early in his career, and was the bandleader for the Paris Jazz All Stars in 1966-1967. He recorded as a leader and also worked as a sideman for Lester Bowie, Elton John, Maynard Ferguson, and Ben Webster. In the 1980s, he became an arranger for Studio Brussels' CIM Big Band.

References

Michel Laplace, "Ivan Jullien". The New Grove Dictionary of Jazz. 2nd edition, ed. Barry Kernfeld.

1934 births
2015 deaths
French jazz trumpeters
Male trumpeters
French jazz bandleaders
French session musicians
French jazz musicians
French male jazz musicians